James Nicol Robinson was a lawyer and politician in Brisbane, Queensland, Australia. He was Mayor of Brisbane in 1900.

References

Mayors and Lord Mayors of Brisbane